is a Japanese former international table tennis player.

Table tennis career
He won a bronze medal in the men's doubles with Keisuke Tsunoda at the 1957 World Table Tennis Championships.

He won a gold medal in the team event for Japan.

See also
 List of table tennis players
 List of World Table Tennis Championships medalists

References

Japanese male table tennis players
World Table Tennis Championships medalists